The South Shore of Long Island, in the U.S. state of New York, is the area along Long Island's Atlantic Ocean shoreline.

Description 
Though some consider the South Shore to include parts of Queens, particularly the beach communities in the Rockaways such as Belle Harbor, the term is generally used to refer to the Long Island coastline in Nassau and Suffolk counties. It is often used as a generic name for the entire southern half of Long Island rather than just the area immediately adjacent to the coastline.

The South Shore tends to be diverse in culture and income as it varies from one hamlet or village to another. In Suffolk County, there still remain pockets of old money from the Gilded Age, including the country seats of families from the Vanderbilts, Havemeyers, and Bournes to the Gardiners, Bayard-Cutting as well as many others.  

The South Shore is also home to the seaside resort of The Hamptons on its east end, located on the South Fork of Long Island.  On its west end, bordering Queens, the Five Towns retains pockets of affluence similar in character to the Gold Coast of the North Shore and The Hamptons. The South Shore is very liminal.

South Shore communities 

Amityville
Atlantic Beach
Babylon 
Baldwin
Baldwin Harbor
Bay Shore
Bayport
Bellmore
Bellport
Bethpage
Blue Point
Bohemia
Brentwood
Brightwaters
Cedarhurst
Center Moriches
Central Islip
Copiague
Copiague Harbor
Deer Park
East Islip
East Moriches
East Patchogue
East Rockaway
East Quogue
Eastport
Elmont 
Farmingdale
Five Towns
Freeport
Gilgo Beach
Great River
Hewlett
Holbrook
Inwood
Island Park
Islip
Islip Terrace
Kismet
Lawrence
Levittown
Lido Beach
Lindenhurst
Long Beach
Lynbrook
Malverne
Massapequa
Massapequa Park
Mastic
Mastic Beach
Medford
Merrick
Moriches
North Amityville
North Babylon
North Bellmore
North Bellport
North Lindenhurst
North Massapequa
North Merrick
North Valley Stream
Oak Beach
Oakdale
Oceanside
Patchogue
Point Lookout
Rockville Centre
Ronkonkoma
Roosevelt
Sayville
Seaford
Shirley
Valley Stream
Wantagh
West Babylon
West Gilgo Beach
West Islip
West Sayville
Woodmere
Wyandanch

Beaches 
In approximate west to east order:

Atlantic Beach
Long Beach
Lido Beach
Jones Beach State Park
Tobay Beach
Gilgo State Park
Robert Moses State Park
Fire Island
Smith Point County Park
West Hampton Dunes
Quogue
Southampton
East Hampton
Hither Hills State Park
Montauk Point State Park

References

Geography of Long Island
Geography of Nassau County, New York
Geography of Suffolk County, New York